Yamansarovo (Yamanharı) is a rural locality (a selo) in Bakhmutsky Selsoviet, Kuyurgazinsky District, Bashkortostan, Russia. The population was 232 as of 2010. There are 7 streets.

Geography 
Yamansarovo is located 22 km southeast of Yermolayevo (the district's administrative centre) by road. Samartsevo is the nearest rural locality.

References 

Rural localities in Kuyurgazinsky District